The 2012 ATP World Tour is the global elite professional tennis circuit organized by the Association of Tennis Professionals (ATP) for the 2012 tennis season. The 2012 ATP World Tour calendar comprises the Grand Slam tournaments (supervised by the International Tennis Federation (ITF)), the ATP World Tour Masters 1000, the ATP World Tour 500 series, the ATP World Tour 250 series, the ATP World Team Championship, the Davis Cup (organized by the ITF), the ATP World Tour Finals, and the tennis event at the London Summer Olympic Games. Also included in the 2012 calendar is the Hopman Cup, which is organized by the ITF and does not distribute ranking points.

Schedule
This is the complete schedule of events on the 2012 calendar, with player progression documented from the quarterfinals stage.

Key

January

February

March

April

May

June

July

August

September

October

November

Statistical information

These tables present the number of singles (S), doubles (D), and mixed doubles (X) titles won by each player and each nation during the season, within all the tournament categories of the 2012 ATP World Tour: the Grand Slam tournaments, the tennis event at the London Summer Olympic Games, the ATP World Tour Finals, the ATP World Tour Masters 1000, the ATP World Tour 500 series, and the ATP World Tour 250 series. The players/nations are sorted by: 1) total number of titles (a doubles title won by two players representing the same nation counts as only one win for the nation); 2) cumulated importance of those titles (one Grand Slam win equalling two Masters 1000 wins, one ATP World Tour Finals win equalling one-and-a-half Masters 1000 win, one Masters 1000 win equalling two 500 events wins, one Olympic win equalling one-and-a-half 500 event win, one 500 event win equalling two 250 events wins); 3) a singles > doubles > mixed doubles hierarchy; 4) alphabetical order (by family names for players).

Key

Titles won by player

Titles won by nation

Titles information
The following players won their first main circuit title in singles, doubles, or mixed doubles:
Singles
 Martin Kližan – St. Petersburg (singles)

Doubles
 Lukáš Rosol – Doha (doubles)
 Janko Tipsarević – Chennai (doubles)
 Édouard Roger-Vasselin – Montpellier (doubles)
 Marcos Baghdatis – Zagreb (doubles)
 Frederico Gil – Viña del Mar (doubles)
 Daniel Gimeno Traver – Viña del Mar (doubles)
 Frederik Nielsen – Wimbledon Championships (doubles)
 Jonathan Marray – Wimbledon Championships (doubles)
 Ruben Bemelmans – Los Angeles (doubles)
 Treat Conrad Huey – Washington, D.C. (doubles)
 Dominic Inglot – Washington, D.C. (doubles)
 Danai Udomchoke – Bangkok (doubles)
 Andre Begemann – Vienna (doubles)
 Martin Emmrich – Vienna (doubles)

Mixed doubles
 Horia Tecău – Australian Open (mixed doubles)
 Bruno Soares – US Open (mixed doubles)

The following players defended a main circuit title in singles, doubles, or mixed doubles:
 David Ferrer – Auckland (singles), Acapulco (singles)
 Leander Paes – Chennai (doubles), Miami (doubles)
 Novak Djokovic – Australian Open (singles), Miami (singles), Toronto (singles)
 Bruno Soares – São Paulo (doubles)
 Nicolás Almagro – São Paulo (singles), Nice (singles)
 Milos Raonic – San Jose (singles)
 Max Mirnyi – Memphis (doubles), French Open (doubles)
 Daniel Nestor – Memphis (doubles), French Open (doubles)
 Pablo Andújar – Casablanca (singles)
 Rafael Nadal – Monte Carlo (singles), Barcelona (singles), French Open (singles)
 Bob Bryan – Monte Carlo (doubles)
 Mike Bryan – Monte Carlo (doubles)
 Juan Martín del Potro – Estoril (singles)
 Jean-Julien Rojer – Estoril (doubles)
 Aisam-ul-Haq Qureshi – Halle (doubles)
 Robert Lindstedt – Båstad (doubles)
 Horia Tecău – Båstad (doubles)
 John Isner – Newport (singles), Winston–Salem (singles)
 Matthew Ebden – Atlanta (doubles)
 Robin Haase – Kitzbühel (singles)
 Xavier Malisse – Los Angeles (doubles)
 Jo-Wilfried Tsonga – Metz (singles)
 František Čermák – Moscow (doubles)
 Nenad Zimonjić – Basel (doubles)
 Rohan Bopanna – Paris (doubles)

ATP rankings
These are the ATP rankings of the top twenty singles players, doubles players, and the top ten doubles teams on the ATP Tour, at the end of the 2011 ATP World Tour, and at the current date of the 2012 season. Players in gold background have qualified for the Year-End Championships. Rafael Nadal withdrew due to a knee injury.

Singles

Number 1 ranking

Doubles

Prize money leaders

Statistics leaders

Best Matches by ATPWorldTour.com

Best 5 Grand Slam / Olympic matches

Best 5 ATP World Tour matches

Point distribution

Retirements

Following is a list of notable players (winners of a main tour title, and/or part of the ATP rankings top 100 (singles) or top 50 (doubles) for at least one week) who announced their retirement from professional tennis, became inactive (after not playing for more than 52 weeks), or were permanently banned from playing, during the 2012 season:
 José Acasuso (born 20 October 1982 in Posadas, Argentina) turned professional in 1999, reaching career-high rankings of singles no. 20 and doubles no. 27, both in 2006. Mainly a clay-court specialist, the Argentine took three singles and five doubles career titles, all on the surface. Playing for Argentina, Acasuso competed in two Davis Cup finals (2006, 2008), and won one World Team Cup title in 2007. Acasuso announced his retirement in February. He played his last match during the French Open qualifying in May 2011.
  Juan Pablo Brzezicki (born 12 April 1982 in Buenos Aires, Argentina) joined the tour in 2001, reaching a career-high ranking of singles no. 94 in 2008. Winner of one doubles titles on the main circuit, Brzezicki competed for the last time in Buenos Aires in February.
 Juan Ignacio Chela (born 30 August 1979 in Ciudad Evita, Argentina) turned professional in 1998, reaching career-high rankings of singles no. 15 in 2004, and doubles no. 34 in 2004. Chela won six singles and three doubles titles during his career on the main circuit, his best Grand Slam results coming with two quarterfinals at the French Open (2004 and 2011) and one quarterfinal at the US Open (2007). At Wimbledon in 2010), he reached the semifinals of the doubles with countryman Eduardo Schwank, losing to Robert Lindstedt and Horia Tecău. Chela last played at the Wimbledon Championships in July, before announcing his retirement in December.
 Arnaud Clément (born 17 December 1977 in Aix-en-Provence, France) became a tennis professional in 1996, peaking as singles no. 10 in 2001, and doubles no. 8 in 2008. In singles, Clément won four titles, made the quarterfinals at all majors but one (the French Open), and reached one Grand Slam final at the Australian Open (2001, losing to Agassi). In doubles, he collected 12 titles and made two major finals with Michaël Llodra, winning one at Wimbledon (2007), and losing the other in Australia (2008). The Frenchman played his last event on the tour in the Wimbledon doubles in July.
 Brian Dabul (born February 24, 1984, in Buenos Aires, Argentina) turned professional in 2001 and reached a career-high ranking of no. 86. His highest doubles ranking was no. 88. He won only one ATP titles in doubles in Viña de Mar in 2009, partnering Pablo Cuevas. He played his last singles match in Guayaquil on 21 November 2011.
 Juan Carlos Ferrero (born 12 February 1980 in Ontinyent, Spain) joined the main circuit in 1998, and reached the world no. 1 ranking in singles on September 8, 2003, holding the spot for a single spell of eight weeks, and finishing three straight seasons in the top 10 (2001–03). Ferrero won 16 singles titles during his 14-year career, including four Masters events, and one Grand Slam trophy at the French Open (2003, def Verkerk). A one-time semifinalist at the Australian Open (2004) and two-time quarterfinalist at Wimbledon (2007, 2009), the Spaniard also made two additional major finals at the French (2002, lost to Costa) and the US Open (2003, lost to Roddick), and reached one year-end championships final (2002, lost to Hewitt). As part of his country's team, Ferrero took part in three victorious Davis Cup campaigns (2000, 2004, 2009). The Spaniard retired after playing in Valencia in October.
  Fernando González (born 29 July 1980 in Santiago, Chile) joined the main tour in 1999 and reached his best singles ranking, no. 5, in early 2007, finishing two seasons in the top 10 (2006–07). A junior world no. 1, winner of the boys' doubles at the US Open in 1997 and the boys' singles and doubles at the French Open in 1998, González won 11 singles and 3 doubles titles on the pro circuit, and gathered three medals at the Olympics: the bronze in singles and the gold in doubles (w/ Nicolás Massú, def. Kiefer/Schüttler) in 2004, and the silver in singles (lost the final to Nadal) in 2008. The Chilean reached the last eight at every major, making three quarterfinals at Wimbledon (2005) and the US Open (2002, 2009), one semifinal at the French (2009), and one final at the Australian Open (2007, lost to Federer). Struggling with injuries for more than a year before deciding to retire, González played his last event in Miami in March.
 Mark Knowles (born 4 September 1971 in Nassau, The Bahamas) joined the pro tour in 1992, reached the singles no. 96 spot in 1996, and the doubles world no. 1 ranking in June 2002, keeping the spot for a total of 65 weeks between 2002 and 2005, and finishing two seasons (2002, 2004) as no. 1. Partnering Daniel Nestor for most of his career, and later Mahesh Bhupathi, Knowles won 55 doubles titles, including one year-end championship (2007), and three Grand Slam trophies (all w/ Nestor) out of 13 finals (one Australian Open (2002), one French Open (2007), and one US Open (2004)). Knowles also claimed one mixed doubles win at Wimbledon (2009, w/ Grönefeld). He retired after competing in the US Open doubles in August.
  Ivan Ljubičić (born 19 March 1979 in Banja Luka, SFR Yugoslavia, now Bosnia and Herzegovina) turned professional in 1998, peaking at no. 3 in singles in 2006, ending two seasons in the top 10 (2005–06). During his career Ljubičić won 10 singles titles, including one Masters at Indian Wells (2010), and went past the fourth round twice in Grand Slam tournaments, reaching one quarterfinal at the Australian Open (2006) and one semifinal at the French Open (2006). Playing for his country, the Croat partnered Mario Ančić to a bronze medal in doubles at the 2004 Athens Olympics and took part in one successful Davis Cup campaign (2005). Ljubičić played his last tournament in Monte Carlo in April.
 Peter Luczak (born 31 August 1979 in Warsaw, Poland, moved to Australia in 1980) joined the main circuit in 2000, peaking at no. 64 in singles in 2009. Competing mainly on the ITF Men's Circuit and the ATP Challenger Tour during his career, Luczak's best result came with a gold medal in doubles (w/ Hanley) at the 2010 New Delhi Commonwealth Games. The Australian retired from the sport after losing in the second round of the Australian Open doubles in January.
 Andy Roddick (born 30 August 1982 in Omaha, United States) turned professional in 2000 and became the sixth American player to be ranked world no. 1 in singles when he reached the top spot on November 3, 2003, holding it for a single spell of 13 straight weeks. Roddick finished nine seasons in the ATP rankings singles top 10 (2002–10), including one year as no. 1 (2003), and also reached the no. 50 ranking in doubles in 2010. As a junior, the American took two singles Grand Slam titles at the Australian Open and the US Open in 2000, finishing the season as junior world no. 1. Over his 12-year pro career, Roddick collected 32 singles titles, on every surface, among which five Masters and one Grand Slam title, at the US Open (2003, def. Ferrero). Roddick's other best results in majors came with four semifinals at the Australian Open (2003, 2005, 2007, 2009), three finals at Wimbledon (2004, 2005, 2009, all lost to Federer), and another final at the US Open (2006, lost to Federer). In doubles, Roddick won four titles including one Masters trophy. Part of the United States Davis Cup roster for 25 ties over 10 years, Roddick helped the team to a final in 2004, and a title (the country's 32nd) in 2007. The American retired in September, after losing in the fourth round of the US Open.
 Rainer Schüttler (born 25 April 1976 in Korbach, West Germany, now Germany) turned professional in 1995, reaching career-high rankings of singles no. 5 in 2004, and doubles no. 40 in 2005. Schüttler won four singles and four doubles titles during his stint on the main circuit, his best Grand Slam results coming with a final at the Australian Open (2003, lost to Agassi), and a semifinal run at Wimbledon (2008). Alongside countryman Nicolas Kiefer, the German also took the silver medal in doubles at the 2004 Athens Olympics, losing the final in five sets (to González/Massú). Schüttler last played at the Australian Open in January.
 Alexander Waske (born March 31, 1975, in Frankfurt, West Germany) turned professional in 2000 and reached a career-high ranking of no. 89 in singles and no. 16 in doubles. He won four ATP doubles titles and played his last doubles match on 15 October 2012 in Vienna, partnering Janko Tipsarević.

See also

2012 WTA Tour
2012 ATP Challenger Tour
2012 ITF Women's Circuit
2012 ITF Men's Circuit
Association of Tennis Professionals
International Tennis Federation

References
General

Specific

External links
Association of Tennis Professionals (ATP) World Tour official website
International Tennis Federation (ITF) official website

 
ATP World Tour
ATP Tour seasons